The 10th Fighter Wing was a unit of the United States Army Air Forces. Its last assignment was with the Fourth Air Force, based at Hamilton Army Airfield, California. It was inactivated on 1 December 1943.

History
Assigned to Fourth Air Force as prewar Pursuit Wing, remained active at Hamilton Field, California until 1 December 1943.

Lineage
 Constituted as 10th Pursuit Wing on 1 December 1940
 Activated on 10 December 1940
 Inactivated on 7 December 1941.
 Redesignated 10th Fighter Wing and activated on 1 October 1942
 Inactivated on 1 May 1943
 Disbanded on 1 December 1943

Assignments
 Southwest Air District (later 4th Air Force), 10 December 1940 – 1 May 1943.

Stations
 Hamilton Field, California, 10 December 1940 – 1 May 1943

Components
 20th Fighter Group, 18 December 1940 – 1 October 1941
 35th Fighter Group, 9 December 1941 – 12 January 1942

References

 Maurer, Maurer (1983). Air Force Combat Units of World War II. Maxwell AFB, Alabama: Office of Air Force History. .
 US Army Air Force Units 1941-1945

External links

010
Military units and formations disestablished in 1943